Two Lovers is a 2008 American romantic drama film, taking its inspiration from Fyodor Dostoyevsky's 1848 short story "White Nights", which had already been turned into a film seven times, first by Luchino Visconti: Le Notti Bianche (1957). The film is directed by James Gray and stars Joaquin Phoenix, Gwyneth Paltrow, and Vinessa Shaw. It is set in the largely Russian Jewish neighborhood Brighton Beach in New York City, as was Gray's first film Little Odessa. Two Lovers premiered in competition at the 2008 Cannes Film Festival in May. The film was Gray's third to enter the competition at this festival. It was released on February 13, 2009.

Plot
Leonard Kraditor is walking along a bridge over a stream in Brooklyn, when suddenly he jumps into the water in an attempted suicide. He changes his mind and quickly walks home to his parents' apartment. His mother Ruth, seeing him dripping wet, tells her husband Reuben their son has tried it again and it becomes evident that Leonard has attempted suicide before.

His parents tell him that a potential business partner and his family are invited for dinner that night and ask him to be present. When they arrive, Leonard finds that he had been set up with the other family's daughter, Sandra Cohen. She inquires about his interest in photography and notices a photo of a girl above his headboard. He explains he had been engaged to the girl for several years, but the relationship was broken off when it turned out both he and his fiancée carried the gene for Tay–Sachs disease, which results in diseased children who generally don't live beyond age 12, so they would be unable to have healthy children.

Leonard meets a new neighbor, Michelle Rausch, and is immediately attracted to her, choosing to ignore that she is a drug addict. He learns that she is dating a married partner in her law firm, Ronald Blatt. At her request, Leonard agrees to meet the pair for dinner at a restaurant. The couple leave him later that evening, as they have plans to attend the Metropolitan Opera. Leonard returns home dejected, but surprisingly, Sandra arrives, sent over by Leonard's parents. Believing that Leonard wanted her to come by, she realizes by his shocked expression that she was set up. She apologizes for the misunderstanding and says that, if he isn't interested, a lot of other guys are. Leonard says that he likes her, and they kiss and eventually make love, and with time, his relationship with Sandra deepens.

Michelle calls Leonard and says she is sick. He takes her to the hospital, where she has a D&C for a miscarriage.  She had been unaware she was pregnant and is even more angry that Ronald ignored her calls. Leonard takes her home but hides when Ronald arrives unexpectedly. Ronald apologizes to Michelle for not having come to her aid, but Michelle coldly asks Ronald to leave and then asks Leonard to write something on her forearm with his finger while she falls asleep. Leonard writes "I love you".

Two weeks later, Michelle meets Leonard on the roof of their building and tells him that she has broken up with Ronald and is going to San Francisco. Leonard tells her not to leave and professes his love for her. They have sex and plan to leave together the next day for San Francisco.

On New Year's Eve, Leonard buys an engagement ring for Michelle. Sandra's father Michael then summons him and offers him a partnership in the family businesses, assuming that he is going to marry Sandra. Noticing the jeweler's gift bag Leonard is holding, the father assumes it is for Sandra; Leonard lies that it is.

During his parents' New Year's Eve party, Leonard hides in the courtyard to meet Michelle. Michelle arrives late and tells Leonard that she isn't going to San Francisco, because Ronald, having learned Michelle is leaving him for California, has decided to leave his wife and children for her. Disheartened, Leonard permanently breaks things off with her.

Feeling depressed, Leonard heads to the beach, intending to kill himself. When he drops a glove that Sandra had bought for him, he realizes that, in Sandra, he has found someone who loves him and with whom he can build a happy life. He picks up the glove and sees the boxed engagement ring lying on the sand, where he had thrown it from the boardwalk earlier. He returns to the party, where he gives Sandra the ring and embraces her in a tearful passionate hug.

Cast
 Joaquin Phoenix as Leonard Kraditor
 Gwyneth Paltrow as Michelle Rausch
 Vinessa Shaw as Sandra Cohen
 Isabella Rossellini as Mrs. Ruth Kraditor
 Moni Moshonov as Mr. Reuben Kraditor
 Elias Koteas as Ronald Blatt
 Bob Ari as Mr. Michael Cohen
 Julie Budd as Mrs. Carol Cohen
 Iain J. Bopp as David Cohen

Reception
Two Lovers received largely positive reviews from critics. On Rotten Tomatoes, the film has an approval rating of 82%, based on 167 reviews, with an average rating of 6.8/10. The website's consensus reads, "Two Lovers is a complex, intriguing, richly-acted romantic drama". On Metacritic, the film has a score of 74 out of 100, based on 33 reviews. Ray Bennett from The Hollywood Reporter defined the film as "an old-fashioned love story in which the melodramatic trapdoors of shock and surprise never open" and added that the film "will please many and it may win awards", though "the acting is (...) restrained." He also lauded the film as "a throwback to the days when love in the movies involved the mind as well as the heart."

References

External links
 
 
 

2008 films
2008 romantic drama films
2000s English-language films
American romantic drama films
Films set in New York City
Films set in Brooklyn
Films directed by James Gray
Films shot in New York City
Films shot in New Jersey
Films based on White Nights
Films with screenplays by James Gray
2000s American films